The 1986 Atlantic hurricane season was a very inactive season that produced 10 depressions, 6 named storms, 4 hurricanes, and no major hurricanes. The season officially began on June 1, 1986, and lasted until November 30, 1986. These dates conventionally delimit the period of each year when most tropical cyclones form in the Atlantic basin. During the 1986 season, the first subtropical depression formed in the first week of June, while the last tropical cyclone dissipated at the end of the third week of November. The 1986 season had lower than average activity because of an ongoing El Niño event, and was the least active season in the North Atlantic since the 1983 Atlantic hurricane season. This was also the first season since 1972 to have no major hurricanes. 

The season started on June 5 when Subtropical Depression One formed near the Bahamas, which would later gain tropical characteristics and become the first tropical storm of the season; Tropical Storm Andrew. On June 9, Andrew would later be absorbed by a larger low pressure system. On June 23, the season's first hurricane formed; Bonnie, although it attained hurricane status on June 25, just two days after Bonnie's formation. Two more tropical depressions followed suit later in the season. On August 13, the season's fifth tropical depression formed and would later become Hurricane Charley four days later. After Charley dissipated, two more tropical depressions formed on August 31 and September 1. Both dissipated on September 4. On September 7, Tropical Storm Danielle formed and would dissipate on September 10. Just after Danielle dissipated, Hurricane Earl formed and would later become the strongest system of the 1986 Atlantic hurricane season, peaking as a 105 mph Category 2 hurricane and 979 mbars in lowest pressure. No tropical cyclones formed during the months of October and the first half of November. That is, until Hurricane Frances became the latest sixth named storm on record since tropical cyclones were first named in 1950. The season came to a close on November 21, which was when Frances dissipated.



Seasonal forecast and summary
Dr. William M. Gray of Colorado State University issued forecasts on May 29 and July 28 indicating within both forecasts the anticipation of a below normal hurricane season. In May, a total of 8 named tropical storms were expected, with four hurricanes expected, 15 days with hurricanes, and a total of 35 days with a tropical storm active in the northern Atlantic Ocean. In July, the numbers were dropped to a total of 7 named storms, 4 hurricanes, 10 hurricane days, and 25 days with a named tropical storm, which almost perfectly verified.

The season's activity was reflected with a cumulative accumulated cyclone energy (ACE) rating of 36, which is classified as "below normal". ACE is, broadly speaking, a measure of the power of the hurricane multiplied by the length of time it existed, so storms that last a long time, as well as particularly strong hurricanes, have high ACEs. ACE is only calculated for full advisories on tropical systems at or exceeding 34 knots (39 mph, 63 km/h) or tropical storm strength. Subtropical cyclones are excluded from the total.

Timeline of events

June 1
0000 UTC (8:00 p.m. EDT May 31) – The 1986 Atlantic hurricane season officially begins.
June 5
0000 UTC (8:00 p.m. EDT June 4) – Subtropical Depression One formed near the Bahamas.
June 6
0000 UTC (8:00 p.m. EDT June 5) – Subtropical Depression One acquired tropical characteristics and strengthened into Tropical Storm Andrew.
June 7
1200 UTC (8:00 a.m.
June 9
0000 UTC (8:00 p.m. EDT June 8) – Tropical Storm Andrew was absorbed by a low pressure system.
June 23
1800 UTC (1:00 p.m. CDT) – Tropical Depression Two formed in the eastern Gulf of Mexico.
June 24
1800 UTC (1:00 p.m. CDT) – Tropical Depression Two strengthened into Tropical Storm Bonnie.
June 25
1800 UTC (1:00 p.m. CDT) – Tropical Storm Bonnie strengthened into Category 1 hurricane.
June 26
0900 UTC (4:00 a.m.
1000 UTC (5:00 a.m.
1800 UTC (1:00 p.m. CDT) – Hurricane Bonnie weakened back to a tropical storm.
June 27
0000 UTC (7:00 p.m. CDT June 26) – Tropical Storm Bonnie weakened back to a tropical depression.
June 28
1200 UTC (7:00 a.m. CDT) - Tropical Depression Bonnie dissipated in Missouri.

July 23
1200 UTC (8:00 a.m. EDT) – Tropical Depression Three formed 180 miles (290 km) north of Bermuda.
July 28
1200 UTC (8:00 a.m. EDT) – Tropical Depression Three dissipated.

August 4
0600 UTC (1 a.m. CST) – A tropical depression developed in the western Gulf of Mexico.
August 5
1200–1800 UTC (7:00 a.m.–1:00 p.m. CST) – The tropical depression made landfall in North Padre Island, Texas.
1800 UTC (1:00 p.m. CST) – The tropical depression dissipated over southern Texas.
August 13
1200 UTC (8:00 a.m. EDT) – A subtropical depression formed over the Florida Panhandle.
August 15
1200 UTC (8:00 a.m. EDT) – The subtropical depression transitioned into a tropical depression 70 miles (110 km) southeast of Charleston, South Carolina.
1200 UTC (2:00 p.m. EDT) – The tropical depression strengthened into Tropical Storm Charley.
August 17
1200 UTC (8:00 a.m. EDT) – Tropical Storm Charley strengthened into Category 1 hurricane.
1400 UTC (10:00 a.m.
2200 UTC (6:00 p.m.
August 18
1200 UTC (8:00 a.m. EDT) – Hurricane Charley weakened back to a tropical storm.
August 21
0000 UTC (8:00 p.m. EDT) – Tropical Storm Charley transitioned into an extratropical storm.
August 30
1200 UTC (8:00 a.m. EDT) – Tropical Depression Five formed in the mid-Atlantic.

September 1
1200 UTC (8:00 a.m. EDT) – Tropical Depression Six formed in the Gulf of Mexico.
September 4
Around 0600 UTC (1:00 a.m. CST) – Tropical Depression Six made landfall near Altamira, Tamaulipas, Mexico.
1200 UTC (8:00 a.m. EDT) – Tropical Depression Five dissipated east-southeast of Bermuda.
1200 UTC (7:00 a.m. EDT) – Tropical Depression Six dissipated over Mexico.
September 7
2:00 a.m. EDT (0600 UTC) - Tropical Depression Seven formed several hundred miles east of the Windward Islands.
2:00 p.m. EDT (1800 UTC) - Tropical Depression Seven strengthened into Tropical Storm Danielle.
September 8
0600 UTC (2:00 a.m.
September 9
1800 UTC (2:00 p.m. EDT) – Tropical Storm Danielle weakened back to a tropical depression.
September 10
1200 UTC (8:00 a.m. EDT) – Tropical Depression Danielle dissipated in the western Caribbean.
1800 UTC (2:00 p.m. EDT) – Tropical Depression Eight developed 1240 miles (2000 km) east-northeast of Puerto Rico.
September 11
0000 UTC (8:00 p.m. EDT September 10) – Tropical Depression Eight strengthened into Tropical Storm Earl.
1800 UTC (2:00 p.m. EDT) – Tropical Storm Earl strengthened into a Category 1 hurricane.
September 12
1200 UTC (8:00 a.m. EDT) – Hurricane Earl strengthened into a Category 2 hurricane.
September 14
1200 UTC (8:00 a.m.
September 16
0000 UTC (8:00 p.m. EDT September 15) – Hurricane Earl weakened back to a Category 1 hurricane.
September 19
0000 UTC (98:00 p.m. EDT September 18) – Hurricane Earl transitioned into an extratropical cyclone.

There was no tropical cyclone activity in the Atlantic basin during October 1986.

November 18
1800 UTC (2:00 p.m. EDT) – Tropical Depression Nine formed north of the Leeward Islands.
November 19
0600 UTC (2:00 a.m. EDT) – Tropical Depression Nine strengthened into Tropical Storm Frances.
November 20
0600 UTC (2:00 a.m. EDT) – Tropical Storm Frances strengthened into a Category 1 hurricane.
1200 UTC (8:00 a.m.
November 21
1200 UTC (8:00 a.m. EDT) – Hurricane Frances weakened back into a tropical storm.
November 22
0000 UTC (8:00 p.m. EDT) – Tropical Storm Frances merged with an extratropical storm.
November 30
2359 UTC (7:59 p.m. EDT) – The 1986 Atlantic hurricane season officially ended.

Systems

Tropical Storm Andrew

In early June, a large area of disturbed weather persisted over the Greater Antilles, bringing heavy rains to the islands. The area moved northward, developing a circulation over the Bahamas. Strong upper-level winds caused when satellite imagery showed a circulation developing over the Bahamas. Strong upper-level winds caused the structure to resemble a subtropical cyclone, and as a result, the system was classified as a subtropical depression on June 5. The tropical storm approached the South Carolina coast within  before recurving to the northeast on June 7. The storm accelerated to the northeast, briefly crossing into the forecasting territory of Environment Canada, the first of three storms of the season to do so, before ultimately being absorbed by a low pressure system over Canada on June 8.

While active, Andrew posed a threat to the Carolinas. Gale warnings were posted from an area ranging from Cape Lookout to south of Virginia Beach, Virginia on June 7. Three companions were also swept out, all of whom made it back to shore. At Wrightsville Beach and Carolina Beach, at least 40 swimmers were caught in the currents, four of whom were hospitalized. The precursor to the storm produced heavy rainfall across Jamaica that caused a deadly flood event.

Hurricane Bonnie

During late June, a frontal trough drifted into the northeastern Gulf of Mexico, and by June 22 a surface circulation formed. Tracking west-northwestward, it developed into Tropical Depression Two on June 23 while located about 330 miles (535 km) south of Pensacola, Florida. The next day, it attained tropical storm status, and with continued favorable conditions attained hurricane status on June 25 to the south of Louisiana. Bonnie turned to the northwest and made landfall near Sea Rim State Park in Texas. The storm quickly weakened over land as it turned to the north and northeast, and on June 28 it was absorbed by an approaching frontal zone in southeastern Missouri.

Prior to moving ashore, 22,000 people were evacuated. Upon making landfall, Hurricane Bonnie produced a storm surge peaking at 5.2 feet (1.5 m) at Sabine Pass. The hurricane also spawned eleven tornadoes, which, in combination with moderate winds, destroyed about 25 residencies in southwestern Louisiana. Three storm deaths occurred in the Port Arthur, Texas area; two deaths occurred from separate car accidents, and another occurred after a partially paralyzed woman died in a house fire. Hurricane Bonnie caused minor damage totaling $2 million (1986 USD, $3.5 million 2006 USD).

Tropical Depression Three

The third tropical depression of the season was detected early on July 27 in the open waters of the Atlantic, north of Bermuda. Later that afternoon, aircraft reconnaissance found no well-defined circulation and the storm's status was reduced from a depression. The depression never threatened any land areas.

Unnumbered Tropical Depression

A tropical disturbance was detected on August 4 in the northwestern Gulf of Mexico along the lower Texas coast. The low-pressure system moved slowly toward land, limiting the system's development. On August 5, the system became organized enough to be considered a tropical depression. The storm moved inland overnight, dumping several inches of rain over South Texas and causing street flooding in Brownsville and nearby South Padre Island. This storm was not carried as a depression operationally, and thus has no assigned number.

Hurricane Charley

Hurricane Charley was the first hurricane to threaten the east-central United States since Hurricane Gloria in the previous year. The third tropical storm and second hurricane of the season, Charley formed as a subtropical low on August 13 along the Florida panhandle. A few days later intensified it into a tropical storm off the coast of South Carolina, and Charley attained hurricane status before moving across eastern North Carolina. It gradually weakened over the north Atlantic Ocean before transitioning into an extratropical cyclone, though its remnants remained identifiable for over a week until after crossing the British Isles and dissipating on August 30.

The storm brought light to moderate precipitation along its path through the southeastern United States. In Georgia and South Carolina, the rainfall alleviated drought conditions. In North Carolina, where the hurricane made landfall, tidal flooding and downed trees were the primary impact. The storm brought high winds to southeastern Virginia, where 110,000 people were left without power. Minor damage extended along the Atlantic coastline northward through Massachusetts. One traffic fatality was reported each in North Carolina and Virginia. Three people in Maryland died due to a plane crash related to the storm. Throughout the United States, Hurricane Charley caused an estimated $15 million in damage (1986 US$, $29 million 2008 USD).

As an extratropical cyclone, Charley brought heavy rainfall and strong winds to Ireland and the United Kingdom, causing at least 11 deaths. In Ireland, the rainfall set records for 24‑hour totals, including an accumulation of more than 7.8 in (200 mm) which set the record for the greatest daily rainfall total in the country. In the country, the rainfall caused widespread flooding, resulting in two rivers overflowing their banks. In the Dublin area, 451 buildings were flooded, some up to a depth of 8 ft (2.4 m). In the United Kingdom, the storm caused downed trees and power lines, as well as flooded rivers.

Tropical Depression Five

This tropical depression formed in the eastern tropical Atlantic Ocean on August 31. The depression moved west-northwest, then northwest away from the Caribbean Sea without further development before dissipating east-southeast of Bermuda on September 4.

Tropical Depression Six

A tropical wave crossed the Caribbean sea, moving into a favorable upper environment in the western Caribbean sea on August 31. The system formed into a weak tropical depression before crossing the Yucatán peninsula, becoming better organized as it moved into the south-central and western Gulf of Mexico between September 1 and 3. The system moved ashore east-central Mexico before quickly dissipating as a tropical cyclone on September 4. Satellite imagery revealed that its residual cloud pattern persisted over Mexico for an additional couple of days before degenerating.

Tropical Storm Danielle

On September 1, a tropical wave moved off the coast of Africa and headed westward. The disturbance was below the 10 degree latitude as it organized into a tropical depression on September 7 and then a tropical storm later that day. Danielle peaked as a  storm on September 8, while Reconnaissance Aircraft reported gusts of up to hurricane force. After passing through the Lesser Antilles, Danielle encountered vertical wind shear, and on September 10 it dissipated in the central Caribbean. The remnants continued westward and ultimately regenerated into Tropical Storm Lester.

The islands of Saint Vincent and the Grenadines experienced wind gusts up to hurricane force, causing severe power outages and causing roof damage. In the Grenadines, the storm drove a coast guard ship aground, while five people were injured and hundreds of homes were destroyed. Torrential rainfall produced several mudslides, which, in turn, damaged roads, bridges, electricity, and water services.  Danielle also destroyed twelve homes on the island of Barbados. In Trinidad and Tobago, strong flooding of up to four feet caused 27 landslides, destroying four bridges. The storm caused $8 million in damage in Tobago. Total damage from the storm amounted to $9.2 million (1986 USD), mostly to crops, though no deaths were reported.

Hurricane Earl

The strongest storm of the season began as a tropical wave off Africa on September 4. After moving across the tropical Atlantic Ocean it developed into Tropical Depression Eight on September 10 while about 1240 miles (2000 km) east of Puerto Rico. The depression quickly strengthened and reached hurricane strength on September 11, peaked as a Category 2 hurricane on September 12 as it made a half circle, weakened to a Category 1 on September 16 and bounced back the way it came. Earl then turned north and became extratropical southeast of Newfoundland on September 19.

Hurricane Frances

First spotted as a tropical disturbance near the Lesser Antilles on November 15, the system moved generally northward while slowly developing. The system organized into a tropical depression on November 18 and quickly strengthened into a tropical storm. The storm curved northeast and strengthened further, reaching hurricane strength on November 20. However, a surface high-pressure system to the north caused the storm to weaken as the vertical wind shear increased over its center. Frances was later absorbed by an extratropical cyclone on November 21.

Storm names
The following names were used for named storms that formed in the north Atlantic in 1986. No names were retired, so they were used again in the 1992 season. This is the same list used for the 1980 season except for Andrew, which replaced Allen, and was used for the first time in 1986.

Season effects
This is a table of all of the storms that did form in the 1986 Atlantic hurricane season. It includes their duration, names, landfall(s) – denoted by bold location names – damages, and death totals. Deaths in parentheses will be additional and indirect (an example of an indirect death would be a traffic accident), but are still related to that storm. Damage and deaths will include totals while the storm was extratropical or a wave or low, and all of the damage figures are in 1986 USD.

|-
| Andrew ||  || bgcolor=#| ||  ||  || The Carolinas || Minimal ||  ||
|-
| Bonnie ||  || bgcolor=#| ||  ||  || Texas, Louisiana, Southeastern United States ||  ||  (1) ||
|-
| Three ||  || bgcolor=#| ||  ||  || None || None || None ||
|-
| Unnumbered ||  || bgcolor=#| ||  ||  || None || None || None ||
|-
| Charley ||  || bgcolor=#| ||  ||  || Southeastern United States, Mid-Atlantic, Massachusetts, Ireland, United Kingdom, Denmark, Germany, Poland, Scandinavia, Soviet Union || > ||  ||
|-
| Five ||  || bgcolor=#| ||  ||  || None || None || None ||
|-
| Six ||  || bgcolor=#| ||  ||  || Mexico || Minimal || None ||
|-
| Danielle ||  || bgcolor=#| ||  || || Leeward Islands ||  || None ||
|-
| Earl ||  || bgcolor=#| || ||  || None || None || None ||
|-
| Frances ||  || bgcolor=#| ||  ||  || None || None || None ||
|-

See also

List of Atlantic hurricanes
Atlantic hurricane season
1986 Pacific hurricane season
1986 Pacific typhoon season
1986 North Indian Ocean cyclone season
 South-West Indian Ocean cyclone seasons: 1985–86, 1986–87
 Australian region cyclone seasons: 1985–86, 1986–87
 South Pacific cyclone seasons: 1985–86, 1986–87

References

External links
 Monthly Weather Review
  U.S. Rainfall information on tropical cyclones from 1986

 
1986
Articles which contain graphical timelines
1986 ATL